Ahmed Fouad Shennib was a Libyan poet, politician  and ambassador.

Born in Hama, Syria in 1923 of Libyan parents in exile. Shennib was educated at the Sorbonne in Paris and served as cultural attache to UNESCO until 1959. He then served as cultural attache in Washington DC (1959–1963), then Paris, France in 1963. He then returned to Libya in 1963 to serve as Minister of Education and Culture until 1964.

Ahmed Fouad Shennib died in January 2007 of pancreatic cancer in Benghazi, Libya.

Literary Contributions
Ahmed Fouad Shennib is most known for his collection of poems addressing the subject of Libyan nationalism and identity. His poetry stems primarily from the period following the proclamation of Libyan independence in 1951. During this period several poets emerged "who rejected the classical forms of Arabic versification and showed an interest in social problems, particularly the life of the common people". The primary authors of this period were Ahmed Fuad Shennib, Ali Sidqi Abd al-Kadir and Ali al-Ruqii. Common themes of prose during this period were the struggle for independence, social equality and condemned prejudice.

The poems 'Libya', 'After Dusk' and 'Al Ashiqah' regularly feature in the curricula of Arabic Literature covering North Africa.

Notes

Libyan poets
Education ministers of Libya
Libyan diplomats
Libyan nationalists
1923 births
2007 deaths
People from Tripoli, Libya
University of Paris alumni
Deaths from pancreatic cancer
20th-century poets
Libyan expatriates in France
Cultural attachés
Libyan expatriates in Syria